Kingdom Housing Association is a not-for-profit organisation which works throughout east central Scotland to provide housing for single people, families, older people and people who have special needs.

References

Housing associations based in Scotland
Organisations based in Fife